Tolga Safer (born 26 June 1982) is a British actor who is known for playing Igor Karkaroff's Aide in the movie version of Harry Potter and the Goblet of Fire.

Life and career
Safer was born in London, to Turkish Cypriot parents. He started acting at the age of 7 in school plays and attended classes at the Sylvia Young Theatre School. Safer has appeared in various TV commercials for Pepsi and Korres, and The Red Cross, (Directed by Peter Webber). He has appeared in several TV episodes of BBC's Casualty and Doctors. His first main role was in the film Culture Menace which was a British independent movie before working on Harry Potter and the Goblet of Fire in a role created especially for him. Other notable film credits include Sugarhouse alongside Andy Serkis and Ashley Walters and Shoot on Sight. In 2017, Safer appeared alongside Dylan O'Brien in CBS Films' thriller American Assassin.

At the Arcola Theatre, Safer performed in the controversial play 'Bintou' and then on 'Venezuela'. As well as the Arcola Theatre, Tolga Safer has also performed in plays such as Prayer Room at the Birmingham Repertory Theatre. and appeared at The Royal National Theatre.

Filmography

Theatre

References

External links 
 
 

Living people
1982 births
British people of Turkish Cypriot descent
Male actors from London
English male film actors
British people of Cypriot descent
English male stage actors
21st-century English male actors